I'm Crazy About Iris Blond is a 1996 Italian comedy film directed by Carlo Verdone.

Cast
Carlo Verdone as Romeo Spera
Claudia Gerini as Iris Cecere
Andréa Ferréol as Marguerite Pierraud
Nello Mascia as Vincenzo Cecere, Iris's father
Nuccia Fumo as Mariangela Cavone
Mino Reitano as Himself
Didier De Neck as Julien Barison
Alain Montoisy as René Guascognaire
Patrice De Mincke as Daniel Muijian
Liesbet Jannes as Jacqueline Pasinar

Release
The film opened at third place at the Italian box office behind The Hunchback of Notre Dame and fellow opener and Italian comedy A spasso nel tempo, with a gross of $692,750 from 75 screens in its opening weekend.

References

External links

1996 films
Films directed by Carlo Verdone
1990s Italian-language films
1996 comedy films
Italian comedy films
1990s Italian films